A warrior monk is a concept found in various cultures of a person who combines aspects of being a monk, such as deep religious devotion and an ascetic lifestyle, with being a warrior, trained to engage in violent conflict.

Examples include:

 Sant Sipahi is a Sikh ideology, inspired by the lives of Sikh gurus, of a saint soldier who would adhere one's life in strict discipline both in mind and body.
 Sōhei, a type of Japanese warrior.
 Righteous armies, Korean guerilla fighters, including monks
 Knights Templar, Knights Hospitaller and Teutonic Knights, warriors during the Crusades.
 Shaolin Monastery, a Chinese monastery renowned for monks who were experts in the martial arts.
 Naga Sadhus, a militaristic sect of arms-bearing Hindu sannyasi.

In fiction:
 The description of the ideal soldier in the manual of the First Earth Battalion.
 The Jedi Order, a fictional monastic organization in the Star Wars epic space opera franchise
 The Adeptus Astartes, Space Marines, are genetically altered super soldiers who serve the Imperium of Mankind in the Warhammer 40,000 universe alongside the Adepta Sororitas, Sisters of Battle, who are soldier-nuns serving directly under the command of the Imperium's church.

See also 
 
 Bhishma, Hindu mythological character who vows to be celibate and never marry.
 Jim Mattis, US Marine and politician nicknamed "The Warrior Monk"
Parashurama, a mythological rishi (seer) and a kshatriya (warrior) of Vedic/Hindu mythology.

Monks
Warriors